Road to Redemption was a 2008 sports documentary presented by Nike that follows the Men's USA Basketball Team as it prepared for the Beijing Olympics. 

The documentary included behind-the-scenes footage of the team, how they trained, and what was expected of them at the Olympics. 

Five episodes were broadcast from July 2, 2008 to August 5, 2008. The premier was on July 2, the 2nd on July 21,the third on July 31, the fourth and fifth on August 5. The program varied form 30 minutes to an hour.  

The series was shown on ESPN2 and rebroadcast on ESPN Classic. Following the airing of each episode, additional content was made available on ESPN.com, NBA.com, the NBA YouTube channel, and Nikebasketball.com.

Broadcast schedule

References

External links 
 Official Site
 Road to Redemption at NBA.com
 Road to Redemption at Nike.com
 NBA YouTube channel

2000s American documentary television series
Basketball television series
2008 American television series debuts
2008 American television series endings